is an anime character designer, animator, animation supervisor and director. He is a member of the Japanese Animation Creators Association and a winner of the 4th Japan Animation Awards in the Animation Director category.

Career
Moriyama started helping out with in-between animation when he was a student at Kanto Daiichi High School. After graduating from high school, he joined Studio Musashi, which was recruiting staff through newspaper ads. His first work as an official in-betweener was for Toei Animation's Wakusei Robo Danguard Ace. He then moved to Studio Cockpit, where he worked on Galaxy Express 999, before moving on to NeoMedia. At NeoMedia, he worked on Invincible Robo Trider G7 for Sunrise, Doraemon for Shin-Ei Animation, and Belle and Sebastian for Visual 80. With Invincible Robo Trider G7, he was promoted from in-between to key animation. He left NeoMedia in 1982 to work as a freelancer, starting with Combat Mecha Xabungle and Acrobunch.

The popular anime Urusei Yatsura, in which he participated from the same year, was Moriyama's breakthrough work. With this series, he made his debut as an animation director and storyboard artist, and was in charge of the opening animation for the first time, joining a group of popular animators overnight. Chief director Mamoru Oshii, who was responsible for Urusei Yatsura, expected him to become a partner, so Moriyama tried his hand at manga as well by illustrating a manga written by Oshii that was serialized in the Animage magazine in 1984 called . After the end of Urusei Yatsura, he was selected as a character designer for the later series Maison Ikkoku, and has since been in charge of character design for many other works. In 1987, he won the 4th Japan Anime Awards in the Animation Director category. After that, he shifted from animating to directing.

Moriyama was one of the founding members of Studio MIN, a group of freelance animators, and after MIN was disbanded in 1991, he participated in numerous works since, mainly for Chaos Project and Pierrot.

Filmography 

 Cream Lemon Part 4: Pop Chaser (1985, OVA), Character Design, Key Animation
 Project A-Ko (1986, film), Character Design, Animation director
 Honō no Tenkōsei (1991, OVA), Character Design
 Luna Varga (1991, OVA), Character Design
 Mōryō Senki MADARA (1991, OVA), Director
 All Purpose Cultural Cat Girl Nuku Nuku (1992, OVA), Character Design, Animation director
 801 T.T.S. Airbats (1994, OVA), Chief Director, Character Design
 Compiler (1994, OVA), Character Design
 Fire Emblem (1995, OVA), Character Design
 Adventures of Kotetsu (1996, OVA), Director
 Agent Aika (1997, OVA), Character Design
 Jungle de Ikou! (1997, OVA), Director, Storyboard, Character Design, Animation director, Original story
 Geobreeders (1998, OVA), Chief Director
 Geobreeders 2 (2000, OVA), Script, Character Design, Animation director
 Gensomaden Saiyuki: Requiem (2001, film), Character Design
 Step Up Love Story (2002, OVA), Director
 Madara (OVA), Director, Character Design
 Maison Ikkoku (TV), Character Design
 Maison Ikkoku: Kanketsuhen (film), Character Design
 Norakuro-kun (TV), Character Design
 Project A-ko 2: Plot of the Daitokuji Financial Group (OVA), Director, Original creator, Character Design, Animation director
 Project A-ko 3: Cinderella Rhapsody (OVA), Director, Character Design, Original story
 Project A-Ko 4: Final (OVA), Director, Character Design, Original story
 Saiyuki (TV), Character Design
 Shrine of the Morning Mist (TV), Director
 Tales of Titillation (OVA), Character Design – episode 1
 Tokyo Underground (TV), Character Design
 Urusei Yatsura: Remember My Love (film), Chief Animation Director
 Yawaraka Sangokushi Tsukisase!! Ryofuko-chan (OVA), Director, Character Design

References

External links 
 
 

Japanese animators
Living people
1960 births
Anime directors
Japanese storyboard artists